The McHenry County Courthouse in Towner, North Dakota was built in 1907.  Along with a number of other North Dakota courthouses designed by its architects Buechner & Orth, it was listed on the National Register of Historic Places in 1980.

It includes Beaux Arts architecture and is said to be "an economy version" of the architects' Traill County Courthouse design.  Its surface is buff brown brick, and it has a limestone line about the first floor level.

References

Courthouses on the National Register of Historic Places in North Dakota
County courthouses in North Dakota
Beaux-Arts architecture in North Dakota
Government buildings completed in 1907
National Register of Historic Places in McHenry County, North Dakota
1907 establishments in North Dakota